Karsten Polky (born 14 November 1964) is a German former wrestler. He competed at the 1988 Summer Olympics and the 1992 Summer Olympics.

References

External links
 

1964 births
Living people
German male sport wrestlers
Olympic wrestlers of East Germany
Olympic wrestlers of Germany
Wrestlers at the 1988 Summer Olympics
Wrestlers at the 1992 Summer Olympics
People from Bad Schmiedeberg
Sportspeople from Saxony-Anhalt